TMEM106A is a gene that encodes the transmembrane protein 106A (TMEM106A) in Homo sapiens. It is located at 17q21.31 on the plus strand next to cancer-related genes NBR1 and BRCA1. The TMEM106A gene contains a domain of unknown function, DUF1356.

Protein structure 
The TMEM106A protein has a molecular weight of 28.9 kdal. It has 262 amino acids, 240 of which are in the domain of function. The protein has a transmembrane region. There is evidence for a secondary transmembrane region in humans but this region is not conserved in related orthologs.  The protein does not contain a peptide signal protein. The protein structure contains a similar proportion of  alpha-helix and beta-strand secondary structures (this does not include transmembrane structures).

There are several areas for post-translational modification for TMEM106A including: 
 Phosphorylation,
 N-glycosylation
 Lysine glycosylation

Homology

Paralogs 

The TMEM106A gene has two paralogs: TMEM106B and TMEM106C. These paralogs belong to the gene family pfam07092, which belongs to the DUF1356 superfamily. This family consists of several mammalian proteins that are around 250 amino acids in length. TMEM106B and TMEM106C are conserved in invertebrates to mammals.

Orthologs 

The TMEM106A gene has been found in only the Chordate phylum. Of the three subphyla, TMEM106A is most commonly found in Vertebrata and has also been found in select members of Tunicata, which are invertebrate marine filter feeders. This phylum split occurred 722.5 million years ago. TMEM106A has not been seen in bacteria, plants, or fungi.

Expression 
TMEM106A is expressed in several human tissues. The tissues with highest expression are uterus, kidneys, small intestine, and stomach. EST profiles for orthologs show expression is conserved with greatest expression in kidneys and lesser expression in several other areas. Some tissues never show expression including: muscle, adipose tissue, and bone.

Gene neighborhood 
In Homo sapiens, TMEM106A is located next to NBR1, a gene identified as an ovarian tumor antigen monitored in ovarian cancer.  It is also located near BRCA1, a breast cancer tumor suppressor gene. The first 140 amino acids of the TMEM106A protein, including portions of DUF1356 and a transmembrane region, are deleted along with BRCA1 during early-onset breast cancer.

References

External links